Iselin may refer to:

People with the family name
 Adrian G Iselin (1818–1905), American banker, businessman & millionaire
 Charles Oliver Iselin (1854–1932), American banker and yachtsman
 Columbus O'Donnell Iselin (1904–1971), American oceanographer
 Hope Goddard Iselin (1868–1970), American heiress and sportswoman
 Reinhard Iselin (1714–1781), Swiss-Danish baron, merchant and landowner
 Isaak Iselin (1728–1782), Swiss philosopher of history and politics
 John Jay Iselin (1933–2008), American philanthropist
 Philip H. Iselin (1902–1976), American businessman

People with the given name
Female

Iselin Alme (born 1957), Norwegian singer and stage actress
Iselin Michelsen (born 1990), Norwegian glamour model and singer
Iselin Nybø (born 1981), Norwegian politician
Iselin Solheim (born 1990), Norwegian singer-songwriter
Iselin Steiro (born 1985), Norwegian model
Male
Iselín Santos Ovejero (born 1945), Argentinian football player

Places
 Iselin, New Jersey, census-designated place, United States
 Iselin, Pennsylvania, unincorporated community, United States
 Iselin Bank, a bank in the Ross Sea off the coast of Antarctica
 Iselin Seamount, a seamount off the coast of Antarctica